The Burnley and Padiham Independent Party is a registered political party in the United Kingdom, focused on the neighbouring Lancashire towns of Burnley and Padiham.

In 2017, four members of the local Liberal Democrats left the party over its stance on Brexit, to form the Burnley and Padiham Independents.

Neil Mottershead retained his Burnley Borough Council seat in the 2018 election, but in early 2019 Christine White stepped down following claims of harassment from a resident, prompting a by-election which was won by the Lib Dems. Charlie Briggs also retained his seat in 2019, and the party won in the Rosegrove with Lowerhouse and Whittlefield with Ightenhill wards, bringing their total to five councillors.

Briggs also unsuccessfully contested the Parliament constituency in the 2019 United Kingdom general election.

References

Politics of Burnley
Locally based political parties in England